Migoplastis is a genus of moths in the subfamily Arctiinae first described by Rudolf Felder in 1868. They are confined to India's Nilgiri Mountains and to Sri Lanka.

Description
Palpi porrect (extending forward), extending considerably beyond the frons. Antennae bipectinate in both sexes. Mid and hind tibia possess minute spurs. Forewings with rounded apex and outer margin. Vein 3 from before angle of cell and vein 5 from above the angle of cell. Vein 6 from upper angle and veins 7 and 10 from a long areole formed by the anastomosis of veins 8 and 9. Hindwings with vein 2 from before angle of cell. Vein 5 from the angle.

Species
It contains the following species:
Migoplastis alba
Migoplastis correcta

References

Arctiini